The 1983 RAC Trimoco British Saloon Car Championship was the 26th season of the championship. Steve Soper driving a works Rover SD1 built by TWR was initially champion, but after he and the team was disqualified on a  technicality, Andy Rouse won his second drivers title in an Alfa Romeo GTV6.

Season overview

The sporting regulations changed to FIA sanctioned Group A specification, and three different classes competed for honours. TWR expanded their team and ran a trio of Rover Vitesses for Pete Lovett, Jeff Allam and Steve Soper. Austin Rover would also back Roger Dowson Engineering who ran Turbo Metros in Class B whilst Ford supported a semi-works Ford Escort outfit in Class C. GM/Opel entered a single Opel Monza for Tony Lanfranchi. Reigning champion Win Percy would once again drive for Toyota, this time at the wheel of a Supra Turbo. Meanwhile, Frank Sytner raced for the works BMW team.

TWR dominated the season, winning all 11 races. The drivers had the races pretty much their own way until Sytner, who had fallen out with Walkinshaw and left TWR the previous season, protested the legality of the Rover cars to the governing body. In response, Walkinshaw protested Sytner's BMW which led to extended legal wrangling which would drag on until long after the season was over.

Soper beat his more experienced team mates and won the outright championship, while Andy Rouse who had taken over the Alfa Romeo GTV6 run by Pete Hall won Class B after a season long dice with the Metros. In Class C, Alan Minshaw took the class honours in his Volkswagen Golf, seeing off the Ford challenge.

However, six months after the championship was over, Sytner's protest was heard by a Tribunal of Enquiry, chaired by veteran legal counsel Lord Hartley Shawcross. The result was the RAC disqualified the Rover team entirely over bodywork irregularities and engine installation issues, handing the title to Rouse. In response, Austin Rover withdrew from the BSCC immediately as a works outfit to concentrate on competing in Europe, and would not return until 2001 under the guise of MG Rover.

Teams and drivers